Alte Oper is an underground station on line C of the Frankfurt U-Bahn in Frankfurt, Hesse, Germany. It is served by the U6 and U7, and is named after and serves the nearby Alte Oper concert hall.

The station, designed by A.C. Walter, opened on 11 October 1986, and echoes the Alte Oper's Renaissance Revival architecture with its arched, column-free design.

Location
The station is located in the Innenstadt district of the city, under Opernplatz. The eastern entrances, including the station's lift, are located in the square itself, while the western entrances are on Bockenheimer Landstraße, at the intersection with Kettenhofweg.

The Taunusanlage S-Bahn station is located one block south of the square's western edge on Taunusanlage.

References

External links

Frankfurt U-Bahn stations
Railway stations in Germany opened in 1986